Kosmos 2345 ( meaning Cosmos 2345) is a Russian US-KS missile early warning satellite which was launched in 1997 as part of the Russian Space Forces' Oko programme. The satellite is designed to identify missile launches using optical telescopes and infrared sensors.

Kosmos 2345 was launched from Site 200/39 at Baikonur Cosmodrome in Kazakhstan. A Proton-K carrier rocket with a DM-2 upper stage was used to perform the launch, which took place at 20:49 UTC on 14 August 1997. The launch successfully placed the satellite into geostationary orbit. It subsequently received its Kosmos designation, and the international designator 1997-041A. The United States Space Command assigned it the Satellite Catalog Number 24894.

It was the last US-KS satellite and was operational for about 18 months.

See also

List of Kosmos satellites (2251–2500)

References

Spacecraft launched in 1997
Spacecraft launched by Proton rockets
Kosmos satellites
Oko